Academic grading in Canada varies by province, level of education (e.g., elementary, secondary, tertiary), by institution, and faculty. The following are commonly used conversions from percentage grades to letter grades, however, this is not necessarily meaningful, since there is not a uniform scheme for assigning percentage grades either.

Academic grading in Canada – 2021

Alberta

In Alberta, academic grading follows a scale of letter grades (A through D), sentences to describe how well one's performance is to the curricular tasks expected of them, and percentages which are typically reserved for high only percentages are used. In francophone schools, from kindergarten to grade 9 an alternative grading system is used instead of percentages and letter grades: numbers 1 through 4 are used (4 is excellent, 3 is good, 2 is average, and 1 is below average

Note: not all schools utilize a +/− system when giving grades. Some just give the generic grade. Some give percentages.

Level #4: 80–100% (student has demonstrated exemplary performance  related to learning outcomes)

Level #3: 70–79% (student has demonstrated a proficient performance related to learning outcomes)

Level #2: 60–69% (student has demonstrated an adequate performance related to learning outcomes)

Level #1: 50–59% (student has demonstrated a very poor performance  related to learning outcomes)

IEA: Insufficient Evidence Available: indicates that the teacher of a particular course has not gathered enough evidence of a student's learning and thus cannot give a grade for said student.

WDR: Withdrawal: indicted the student has withdrawn from a particular course and thus, is given no grade because of it.

AMP: Academic Malpractice: Indicates that the student was placed in an incorrect class, whether it be by not having the pre-requisite or did not request the class upon registration. No mark was given.

P: Pass: indicates that the student has achieved the bare minimum grade to pass the class granted by a teacher due to reasons beyond the student's control. A grade of P translates into 50% when used to calculate averages for university or college admission.

A mark of 0–49%, is a D and under, is a failure for a class and is typically given for high school and post-secondary students only, but can be given to junior high students too, but isn't typically done. A failing grade will also result in not earning credits for an Alberta High School Diploma or any subject taken in post-secondary and typically means the student will more than likely repeat the course.

British Columbia
This is the system of grading used in many high schools (Grades 10–12) in BC. Each university has its system of marking. Most elementary (Grades K–6) and middle schools (Grades 7–9) in BC no longer use grades, using a standards-based system instead, with some high schools also choosing to do so.

I = Incomplete – Missing assignments

F = Fail – Received grade under 50%

W = The student has withdrawn from this course

P = The student has passed this course though a grade is not available (usually occurs when switching schools/grading systems i.e. moving from the US)

Ontario

The grading standards for public elementary and secondary schools (including secular and separate; English and French first language schools) are set by the Ontario Ministry of Education and includes letter grades and percentages. In addition to letter grades and percentages, the Ministry of Education also uses a level system to mark its students. The four levels correspond to how students are marked on the Ontario rubric. The following is the levels on the Ontario rubric, its meaning, and its corresponding letter/percentage grades:
 Level 4, beyond government standards (A; 80 percent and above)
 Level 3, at government standards (B; 70–79 percent)
 Level 2, approaching government standards (C; 60–69 percent)
 Level 1, well below government standards (D; 50–59 percent)
The grading standards for A− letter grades changed in September 2010 to coincide with a new academic year. The new changes require a higher percentage grade by two or five points to obtain an A or A+ respectively.

Quebec

Quebec's passing mark is 60% and not 50% as compared to some other provinces. Note that it is common practice for students to pass with grades in the range of 55% to 59% at the teacher's discretion. The military pass mark is also generally 60%.

Note: Most schools in Quebec have now switched to percentages. The mark the students receive is the mark that is shown. The 60% passing mark remains.

Saskatchewan

At a high school level in Saskatchewan, most subjects are separated into three competencies. On report cards, marks are normally shown as numbers and an average of the two marks associated with the subject will be calculated. For example, if a student achieves A, A− and B+ in a subject, teachers will calculate an average of the three marks (in this case, 85%).

See also
Education in Canada

Notes

References

Canada
Grading
Grading